Casey Bay is a large Antarctic bay indenting the coast of Enderby Land between Tange Promontory and Dingle Dome. The feature was observed from Australian National Antarctic Research Expeditions aircraft in 1956. It was named by the Antarctic Names Committee of Australia for the Rt. Hon. Richard G. Casey (later Lord Casey), Australian Minister for External Affairs, 1951–60.

Further reading 
 Ute Christina Herzfeld, Atlas of Antarctica: Topographic Maps from Geostatistical Analysis of Satellite Radar Altimeter Data, PP 78 - 79

External links 

 Casey Bay on USGS website
 Casey Bay on AADC website
 Casey Bay on SCAR website
 Casey Bay satellite image

References
 

Bays of Enderby Land